Ablajan Awut Ayup (born 11 November 1984) is a singer, songwriter and dancer who wrote over 400 songs and was known for promoting Uyghur culture and identity as well as building a cultural bridge with the Chinese through his bilingual songs. In 2017, BBC portrayed him as a model of integration for his appeal to both Han and Uyghur audiences.

Ablajan made his debut with his song "Meshrep Nawasi" in January 2010 in the "Meshrep Concert". "Meshrep Nawasi" was republished in the English and Chinese languages. Later, "Meshrep Nawasi" became one of Ablajan's iconic songs. He published his first album "Bashlamduq (Shall We Start?)" on July 10, 2011. His first album sold over 100,000 copies, no small achievement in a limited market. Local businesses vied to endorse Ablajan and his face graced billboards in Xinjiang's capital, Ürümqi. Ablajan signed a contract with Marrybrown Sdn Bhd in 2016 and became a brand ambassador in China for the Malaysian fast food chain.

In 2018, Radio Free Asia reported that Ayup had been detained by police in Guma (Pishan) County. His brother reported that Ayup had been sent to one of the Xinjiang re-education camps.

Early life

Ablajan was born in Sanju Village, a remote village in Guma County of Hotan Prefecture of Xinjiang Uyghur Autonomous Region, on 11 November 1984. His mother is a cadre and his father is a farmer. His parents sent all their children to university which was rare among members of his village.

As Ablajan found himself attracted to music, he began to learn music by himself. His parents also supported him and bought him a musical keyboard. Ablajan then registered for Turpan Normal College's admission exam in order to get into its arts program. Some months later, he received the admission letter but he had been admitted into their painting program rather than the music program.

Ablajan started studying in the Turpan Normal College's Painting Program in 1998 and was graduated in 2001.

He studied dance in Ürümqi Performance Company from January to April in 2002. Then he went for the entrance exam of Xinjiang Arts Institute in 2003 and he was admitted. He was delighted to study music systematically. However, his parents told him that he had to return home if he had a job opportunity in a government organisation. He was later hired by Sanju Elementary School.

Professional life
He worked as an Art Teacher in Sanju Elementary School from 2004 to 2006. During this period, he couldn't give up his passion to study music, and eventually resigned from his position. He then went to Urumchi in pursuit of his dream. In the beginning, he found himself helpless. He felt alone and scared to go back home as he told his parents he was leaving to study music. He found himself lost with disappointment. At that time, he had a friend called Dilshat who taught English at Xinjiang University. They used to meet often and had common opinions. As soon as Dilshat discovered that Ablajan was unsure about his future, Dilshat encouraged him to go on. One day, Dilshat introduced Ablajan to a famous singer Mewlan Memtimin in Ürümqi. Ablajan sang his first song "Salute to My Hometown" to Mewlan. Mewlan commented Ablajan's was talented and said: "you have a great future. Never give up, don't waste your time, there are many things you should learn." Mewlan also shared his stories with Ablajan. After that day, Ablajan found his confidence back and restarted his life.

Ablajan studied English within a year. Then, he was admitted again to Xinjiang Arts Institute in 2007. He began to write his song at the same time he started to study. In late 2008, he joined "Times Studio" which was headed by Mewlan Memtimin. He learned very quickly the techniques to compose music with a computer. In 2009, he published online his first ever professional-level song "Taqqa Tuqqu"(This is name of Uyghur children's game). This song was favored very well by the public. The success of his first song made him very delighted. He believed more on his dream to come true. But, remembering his life from 2006 to 2009 in a television interview, he said "This period was very difficult for me. I took my resume to many arts clubs and organizations. they refused me saying I am not professional singer. They didn't understand my passion. I am used to live in small room alone. I had even worn a shoes for two years."

Musical career start
Ablajan started his career by writing lyrics for singers. In 2007, he wrote the lyrics of the song "Söygü izhari(Revelation of Love)" which was prepared for a TV music competition "Nawa". In November 2008, he wrote the lyrics of the song "Kel Yenimgha(Come to Me)" which was performed in the concert of Amangul Sidiq "Shebnem Concert". In December 2008, he wrote the lyrics of the song "Oyna Shadiman(Play Joyfully)" which was sung by Gulmire Turghun in Nawa.

Ablajan also composed songs for other singers during his early career. He composed a song for Mewlan Memtimin who participated in "Chinese New Year's Concert". Mewlan sang the song "Bu Hayat(The Life)" composed by Ablajan. He composed the "Uzung Kim(Who are You?)" for Mewlan Memtimin who participated in "Jula Concert" organized by Urumchi TV Station. He composed the new song "Sensiz" for Mewlan Memtimin who featured in "Dil Kuyi Concert" in April 2010. He also composed the song "Bu Hayat(The Life)" for a movie called "Dap" which is produced by Xinjiang People's Broadcasting Station in December 2008.

He published many singles dedicated to many concerts and other events during his career. In March 2009, he published his new song "Men Seni Suyimen(I Love You)" on major music forums in China. He featured with his teenage friends in the TV show "Meshrep" and sang his latest song "Meshrep Nawasi" January 2010. This is one of his iconic song which gave him more prestige. He covered this song again in the first edition of a children's TV show "Qar Leylisi Meshripi" and this song became the theme song of this TV show. On October 9, 2011, he featured again in "Qar Leylisi Meshripi" with the invitation of Arman Halal Food Group and covered his classic song "Meshrep Nawasi English Edition" with new dance which was created with cooperation between him and DSP group which is famous street dance group. He featured with his classic song "Meshrep Nawasi English Edition" with "DSP Group" in a concert aimed to celebrate the 10th anniversary of the foundation of "DSP" Group on March 24, 2012. In April 2010, he featured in the "Music and Dance Concert" which was organized by Arkin Music Studio, Dil Kuyi Media Center and Ürümqi Television Station. He published his latest two songs "Suygu Iqrari(Love Confession)" and "Umaq Jananim(Lovely Baby)" in this event.

On November 2, 2010, he featured in the "Eid Concert" which was organized by Xinjiang Television station and published his latest song "Are There Kids To Play". Later, this song was chosen as "Best Composition of The Concert". He featured in the "Jula Concert" which was organized by Yulghun Studio and published his latest song "Herketlen (Move up)" on May 16, 2011. He featured in "2012 Eid Concert" organized by Xinjiang TV station and published his latest song "Mektep Guzili (Campus Beauty)" on October 25, 2012. He featured in the "Zaman(Times) Concert" organized by Dolan corporation and published his latest two songs "Tetil (Vacation)" and "Guman we Arman (Dream and Doubt)" with his teenage partners Firdos and Anwer from January 1 to 5, 2013. He featured in the "Muxter Bughra Concert" organized by Xinjiang Dilkuyi Media Corporation and published his latest two songs "Qar Melike (Snow Princess)" and "Atles Kuynek (Shirt)" on May 1, 2013. He featured in the TV program "Meshrep" and published his latest song "Kunlemchi Qizchaq(Jealous Girl)" on December 2, 2013. He published online his latest song "Sadda Qizchaq (Naive Girl)" on December 12, 2013.

A hot performer
Ablajan is a hot figure in north-western China who had been interviewed on many TV and Radio programs. He was interviewed for the radio show "Continuous Melody" by China National Radio on December 26, 2010. He was interviewed on the TV show "Art's Garden" of Xinjiang TV station on January 21, 2011. He was interviewed by a radio music show by FM 101.7 channel of Xinjiang People's Broadcasting Station in March 2011. He was interviewed with his teenage partners on TV by Urumchi TV station children's No. 2 channel, on February 21, 2011. He was interviewed on a campus TV program of Xinjiang Arts Institute on April 23, 2011. He was interviewed for the radio show "Rose Club" of FM 107.4 channel of Xinjiang People's Broadcasting Station on May 29, 2011. He was interviewed on the TV show "Umud Ghunchiliry" of Ürümqi TV station on September 1, 2012. He was interviewed on the TV program "Kunguldiki Suz (Heartful Story)" of Xinjiang TV station on October 22, 2012. He featured in radio show "Arts Forum Special Program" of FM 107.4 channel and shared his work related to the composition of the song "Uyghur Alphabet Song".

Ablajan was invited as honored guest to many concerts, TV programs and events. He participated in a TV show "Umud Yultuzi" which was organized by the 5th channel of Xinjiang TV station on November 2, 2010. He was invited for a "Children's Concert" which was organized by Homeless Children Protection Center of Xinjiang Uyghur Autonomous Region on April 23, 2011. He participated as one of the judges to the TV show competition "Qar Leylisi" which was organized by Xinjiang TV station Children's channel on December 27, 2010. He was invited to the TV show "Meshrep" by Xinjiang TV station and covered his song "Tashlap Oynayli (Let's Dance)" on May 27, 2011. He featured with his teenage partners Shirinay Miradil in the "New Year Concert" organized by Xinjiang TV station second channel on January 1, 2013. He featured in the event "Mining Sehnem (My Stage)" organized by Xinjiang Dolan corporation and Keram Studio and performed on January 19, 2013. He featured in the concert "Bahar we Balilar (Spring and Children)" organized by Stars Culture and Arts Corporation from March 9 to 10, 2013. He featured in the "Yadikar Concert" organized by Yadikar corporation on May 16, 2013. He featured in the TV show "Meshrep" and covered his song "Etles Kuynek (Shirt)" on July 29, 2013. He featured in "Eid Concert" with his teenage partners Shirinay Ghulamjan and Shiringul Metsali and covered his song "Alphabet Song" on August 7, 2013. He featured in the "Hoten Gemstones Festival" and performed on August 28, 2013. He featured in the "Kinara sowghisi Concert" and performed on September 12, 2013. He featured in the "Zaman Concert" which was organized by Xinjiang Dolan Corporation on September 22, 2013. He participated in the "Chinese Golden Melody Award, Xinjiang Music Base Opening Ceremony" as honored guest with his team and performed on October 6, 2013. He featured in the "China-Turkey Friendship Concert" which was organized by Ankara-China Businessmen Association and Jangawan Performance Company in Ürümqi Ergong Stadium on October 22, 2013. In the concert, featured also Ismail YK who is Turkish Pop-Arabesque singer and composer. Ablajan participated as honored guest and performed. He participated in the "Chinese Music Awards 2013 Edition" as honored guest and published his latest song "Mektep Guzili" on November 11, 2014. On January 23 and 24, 2014, he participated in the " Xinjiang New Singing" Folk Chinese Spring Festival concert and the Chinese Spring Festival concert hosted by the Cultural Department of the Xinjiang Uyghur Autonomous Region. He sang the single "Today" and sang "Dream Hero" with the famous guitar master and singer Kehirman.

Endorsement and Commercial value
Ablajan's commercial value has been increasing as he became popular and signed many contracts with local and overseas businesses. He featured in a TV advertisement which was dedicated to a new Jelly product of Aprin Business Limited on November 10, 2010. He featured in the TV commercial of new chocolate product "Alfin" made by Xinjiang Arman Halal Food Corporation in June 2013. Accepting the offer made by Ilqi Clothing Company, he became the brand ambassador for the clothing marketed with cooperation between Ilqi corporation and Turkey Serësiye company in July 2013. He participated in the opening ceremony of Urumchi Tilek Restaurant and became the brand ambassador on October 22, 2013. He signed a contract with Marrybrown Sdn Bhd in 2016 and became a brand ambassador in China.

He founded Ablajan Cultural Items corporation limited, and started a fashion line in 2015.

Honors and awards
His single "Taqqa Tuqqu" was awarded the third prize in "Celebration of 60th Anniversary of China, Music Competition" which was organized by Xinjiang People's Broadcasting Station in October 2009.
His single "Meshrep Nawasi Chinese Edition" was awarded a silver prize in "2012 National Children's Song Contest" in August 2012.
His single "Qar Melike (Snow Princess)" was ranked 18th in Sina Weibo Most Popular Music list on May 19, 2013.
His single "Guman ve Arman" was ranked 8th in Sina Weibo Most Popular Music list on May 19, 2013.
His single "Vacation" (Chinese Edition) was awarded second prize in "Xinjiang New Music Competition".
Times magazine published an article "It's a Long Way to the Top (if You Wanna Be a Uighur Pop Star)" about Ablajan on October 6, 2014. He became the first Uyghur singer who is introduced in the magazine. 
His received "Star of the Silk Road" Award 2013 by the Xinjang Cultural Bureau.
His single "Today" received the "2014 Top 10 Song Award" in the event "Award Ceremony for Best Compositors of 2014 in Xinjiang". 
His single "校花 (Campus Beauty)" was awarded the "Annual Best World/Ethnic Song" at the Annual Chinese Golden Melody Awards Ceremony held in Guangzhou.

Discography
He published his first album "Bashlamduq (Shall We Start)" on July 10, 2011.Bashlamduq \ Shall we start\开始吧
1. Eski (Bad)
2. Guzel Rena (Beautiful Girl)
3. Herketlen (move yourself) 
4. Meshrep Nawasi (Voice of Meshrep)
5. Umaq Jananim (Cute Baby)
6. Oynaydighan Bala Barmu (is there kid to play)
7. Suygu Iqrari (Love Confession)
8. Taqqa Tuqqu (this is name of Uyghur traditional game for kids)
9. Tashlap Oynayli (let's dance freely)
10. Telifunungni Al (answer your phone) 
11. U mining Atam (He is my father)
12. Saxta (fake)

He published his first Chinese EP Album "就是我 （Just Me）" on December 18, 2013.
1. Bugun (今天, Today)
2. Yeqin kel (来到我身边, Come Closer)
3. Aptap Chiq (太阳升起来, Sun Rise)
4. Sini Soyimen (我爱你, I love you)

He published his third album "Shahzade (Prince)".
1. Baliliq Chaghlar (Childhood Times) 
2. Begzade (Gentlemen)
3. Bengbash (hotheaded)
4. Bugun (Today)
5. Eski 2 (Bad 2)
6. Eliship Qalmisamla (if only I don't lose my mind)
7. Kunlamchi Qizchaq (Jealous Girl)
8. Manga Yatliq Bol (Mery Me)
9. Melimizde Meshrep Bar (There is Meshrep in our village)
10. Meptun (Captivated)
11. Meylimu (no matter?)
12. Renggareng (colorful)
13. Suyumluk Mu'ellim (Dear Teacher)

Disappearance
In 2018, Ablajan disappeared in February 2018 after being detained by the Guma police, and had vanished since. His disappearance was believed to be linked with the fact he promoted the Uyghur identity and Uyghur culture, as well as wider Turkic culture as a whole. Ayup's brother reported that Ayup had been detained in a Xinjiang re-education camp.

See also
Abdulla Abdurehim
Amannisa Khan
Dilber Yunus
Erkin Abdulla
Michael Jackson
Murat Nasyrov
Perhat Khaliq
Abdurehim Heyt

General
List of people who disappeared
List of Uyghurs

References

1984 births
2010s missing person cases
Male dancers
Missing people
Missing person cases in China
Male pop singers
Uyghur music